Prostoia is a genus of spring stoneflies in the family Nemouridae. There are about five described species in Prostoia.

Species
These five species belong to the genus Prostoia:
 Prostoia besametsa (Ricker, 1952)
 Prostoia completa (Walker, 1852) (central forestfly)
 Prostoia hallasi Kondratieff & Kirchner, 1984
 Prostoia ozarkensis Baumann & Grubbs, 2014
 Prostoia similis (Hagen, 1861) (longhorn forestfly)

References

Further reading

External links

 

Nemouridae
Articles created by Qbugbot